Salinger is a surname.  Notable people with the surname include:
 Conrad Salinger (1901–1962), American arranger-orchestrator and composer
 Diane Salinger (born 1951), American actress and voice actress
 J. D. Salinger (1919–2010), American writer and author of Catcher in the Rye
 Salinger (film), a 2013 documentary film about the American author
 Salinger (book), a 2013 biography about the American author
 Lawrence M. Salinger
 Matt Salinger (born 1960), American actor, the son of author J. D. Salinger and psychologist Claire Douglas
 Michael Salinger (born 1962), American poet, performer, and educator living in Northeast Ohio
 Pierre Salinger (1925–2004), John F. Kennedy's press secretary
 Stefan Salinger (born 1965), Austrian curler

See also 
 Selinger
 Sellinger

German-language surnames
Germanic-language surnames
Jewish surnames